Jasione is a genus of flowering plants within the family Campanulaceae which are native to Europe.

Four species have been found in Turkey and west Mediterranean areas.

Species include:
 Jasione amethystina
 Jasione bulgarica
 Jasione crispa  
 Jasione echinata 
 Jasione foliosa 
 Jasione heldreichii 
 Jasione humilis 
 Jasione laevis (= Jasione perennis)
 Jasione lusitanica
 Jasione maritima
 Jasione mansanetiana 
 Jasione montana 
 Jasione sphaerocephala 
 Jasione tomentosa

References

External links
W3Tropicos

 
Campanulaceae genera